Narenjan may refer to:
 Narenjan-e Jadid, Rostam County